Scopula abornata is a moth of the family Geometridae. It was described by Achille Guenée in 1858. It is endemic to Brazil.

References

Moths described in 1858
abornata
Endemic fauna of Brazil
Moths of South America
Taxa named by Achille Guenée